Epic Times was a news website network started by Jerry Doyle. EpicTimes featured contributors such as former deputy undersecretary of defense in the George W. Bush administration Jed Babbin, and actress and author Anita Finlay.

References

External links
 
 Facebook

Radio stations established in 2013